

2008

This is a list of films produced in Pakistan in 2008 (see 2008 in film) and in the Urdu language.

External links
 Search Pakistani film - IMDB.com

2008
Pakistani
Films